Vicente Cáceres (born 1 May 1967) is a Spanish wrestler. He competed at the 1988 Summer Olympics and the 1992 Summer Olympics.

References

1967 births
Living people
Spanish male sport wrestlers
Olympic wrestlers of Spain
Wrestlers at the 1988 Summer Olympics
Wrestlers at the 1992 Summer Olympics
Sportspeople from Las Palmas
20th-century Spanish people